The Luxembourg film industry is quite small. However, many films have been made in the country, both by native filmmakers and by people from other countries.

In 1993, Dammentour by Paul Scheuer (AFO-Productions) and Hochzäitsnuecht (Paul Cruchten) won awards at the Max Ophüls Festival in Saarbrücken.

Since 2003, the Luxembourg Film Award is awarded for the best productions of Luxembourgian cinema.

List of native feature films made in Luxembourg (selection) 
 (1970) directed by Philippe Schneider
  (1981) directed by  Paul Scheuer,  Georges Fautsch and Maisy Hausemer
  (1981)  directed by Andy Bausch  (8 mm)
  (1984) directed by   Menn Bodson and Marc Olinger starring Josiane Peiffer and René Pütz
   (1983)  directed by  Paul Scheuer starring Josiane Peiffer and Paul Scheuer
  (1985) directed by  Menn Bodson, Gast Rollinger and Marc Olinger starring  Fernand Fox
  (1986) directed by  Andy Bausch starring  Géraldine Karier and Thierry van Werveke
   (1986) directed by  Paul Kieffer and Fränk Hoffmann  starring Mathias Kniesbeck and André Jung
  (1988) directed by Andy Bausch starring  Thierry van Werveke and Jochen Senf
  (1989) directed by   Menn Bodson, Gast Rollinger and Marc Olinger starring  André Jung
  (1989) directed by  Paul Scheuer, Georges Fautsch and Maisy Hausemer starring Josiane Peiffer
  (1989)  directed by Andy Bausch starring Désirée Nosbusch, Sabine Berg  and Thierry van Werveke
  (1990) directed by Paul Kieffer and Fränk Hoffmann starring André Jung, Paul Greisch and Myriam Muller
 Hochzäitsnuecht  (1992) directed by  Pol Cruchten starring Myriam Muller and Thierry van Werveke
  (1992) directed by  Paul Scheuer, Georges Fautsch and Maisy Hausemer starring  Josiane Peiffer and Germain Wagner
  (1993) directed by Andy Bausch starring  Thierry van Werweke, Udo Kier, Eddie Constantine and Désirée Nosbusch
 Back in Trouble (1997) directed by Andy Bausch starring Thierry van Werveke and Moritz Bleibtreu
  (2001) directed by Andy Bausch starring  Thierry van Werveke, André Jung and Myriam Muller
 Rendolepsis (2003) directed by  Marc Barnig
  (2003) starring  Carlo Pallucca, Thierry Stoffel
  (2004) directed by Andy Bausch starring  Thierry van Werveke, André Jung and Sascha Ley
  (2005) directed by Patrick Ernzer & Mike Tereba
 Perl oder Pica  (2006) directed by Pol Cruchten
 E Liewe laang [lb] (1991) directed by Marc Olinger
 Who's Quentin? (2006) directed by Sacha Bachim
  (2009) directed by Adolf El Assal
 The Treasure Knights and the Secret of Melusina (2012)
  (2014) directed by Sacha Bachim
  (2015) directed by 
 Baby(a)lone (2015) directed by Donato Rotunno 
  (2015) directed by Christophe Wagner
 Voices from Chernobyl (2016) directed by Pol Cruchten
 Kropemann [lb] (2016) directed by Patrick Ernzer
  (2017) directed by Andy Bausch
 Gutland (2017) directed by Govinda Van Maele
  (2018) directed by Félix Koch
 Péitruss [lb] (2019) directed by Max Jacoby
  (2019) directed by Luc Feit

List of native documentary films made in Luxembourg (selection) 
 (1937) directed by René Leclère
 Hamilius: Hip Hop Culture in Luxembourg (2010)

List of foreign films made in Luxembourg (selection)

Canada 
 Falling Through (2000) - directed by Colin Bucksey and starring James West and Marjo Baayen

France 
 Une liaison pornographique (1999) - directed by Frédéric Fonteyne and starring Nathalie Baye and Sergi López
 Elles (1997) directed by  Luis Galvão Teles starring  Miou-Miou, Marthe Keller and Marisa Berenson

United Kingdom 
 8½ Women  (1999) - directed by Peter Greenaway and starring John Standing and Matthew Delamere
 Dog Soldiers (2002) - directed by Neil Marshall and starring Kevin McKidd and Sean Pertwee

United States 
The Diva of Mars (1980) - directed by Andy Chagny
 A House in the Hills (1993) - directed by Ken Wiederhorn and starring Michael Madsen and Helen Slater
 An American Werewolf in Paris (1997) - directed by Anthony Waller and starring Tom Everett Scott and Julie Delpy
 The First 9½ Weeks (1998) - directed by Alex Wright and starring Paul Mercurio, Clara Bellar, and Malcolm McDowell
 Fortress 2 (1999) - directed by Geoff Murphy and starring Christophe Lambert
 The New Adventures of Pinocchio (1999) - directed by Michael Anderson
 New World Disorder (1999) - directed by Richard Spence and starring Rutger Hauer, Andrew McCarthy, and Tara FitzGerald
 Wing Commander (1999) - directed by Chris Roberts and starring Freddie Prinze, Jr., Saffron Burrows, and Matthew Lillard
 Shadow of the Vampire (2000) - directed by E. Elias Merhige and starring John Malkovich and Willem Dafoe
 CQ (2001) - directed by Roman Coppola and starring Jeremy Davies and Angela Lindvall
 The Girl with a Pearl Earring (2003)  - directed by Peter Webber and starring Scarlett Johansson, Colin Firth, Tom Wilkinson and Cillian Murphy
 The Merchant of Venice (2004) - directed by Michael Radford and starring Al Pacino, Jeremy Irons and Joseph Fiennes
Retrograde (2004) starring Dolph Lundgren. FIlm was shot in Italy but partly produced in Luxembourg.

See also

 List of Luxembourgish submissions for the Academy Award for Best International Feature Film
 Cinema of the world
 World cinema

References

External links 
 Luxembourg - a film country
 Samsa Film luxembourgish production company
 lucil luxembourgish production company
 Delux Film luxembourgish production company
 Luxembourg Film Fund
 Troublemaker - a review and a biography of Andy Bausch
 european-films.net - Reviews, trailers, interviews, news and previews of new and upcoming European films (in English)